MGP Nordic 2002 was the first annual MGP Nordic, a song competition eligible to singers from Denmark, Norway and Sweden between the ages of 8 and 15. It took place on 27 April 2002 in Copenhagen, Denmark and was hosted by Camilla Ottesen, Stian Barsnes Simonsen and Josefin Sundström.

The winner was then 12-year-old Razz from Denmark with his song "Kickflipper".

Creation of the MGP Nordic
The contest originated in 2000 when Denmark's Radio held a song contest for Danish children that year and in 2001. The idea was extended to a Scandinavian song competition in 2002, MGP Nordic, with Denmark, Norway and Sweden as participants.

The regional MGP Juniors competitions were combined with Junior Eurovision Song Contest after the latter's creation in 2003. MGP Nordic was cancelled from 2003 to 2005 when the countries sent their finalists to JESC. But Denmark and Norway pulled out in 2006 and began holding MGP Nordic competitions again, preferring the original Scandinavian competition. Sweden participated in both contests in 2006 and 2007, with different contestants, but pulled out of JESC in 2008 before returning a year later.

Entries
Each of the three countries holds preselection contests with ten national finalists: Sweden's MGP Junior which was later known as Lilla Melodifestivalen, Norway's MGPjr, and Denmark's De Unges Melodi Grand Prix. The three winners from each country compete in the final MGP Nordic competition.

National selections 
 Norway decided: 23 February 2002
 Denmark decided: 23 March 2002
 Sweden decided: 14 April 2002

Participants

Denmark
 Morten Fillipsen, aged 15 at the time, was born in Hunderup and was raised in Copenhagen. "Du er ikke som de andre pi'r" is about the girl he has a crush on and later appeared on his debut album Hold om mig.
 Razz, real name Rasmus Ott, was born in Klarup. "Kickflipper" later appeared on his debut album of the same name along with an English version called "Kickflipping".
 Emma Thorsteinsson was born on 11 August 1991, and "Du er den, som jeg vil ha'" is about the joys of spending time with a boy she has a crush on.

Norway
 To Små Karer is a rap duo consisting of Nicolay Ramm and Christoffer B. Claussen, both of which were born in 1988. "Paybacktime" is gangsta-oriented and is about beating the counter-mafia.
 Black Jackets is a pop-rock band featuring lead singer Julie Thorp, guitarist Håkon Solvang, bassist Mathias Thorp, who is Julie's brother, and drummer Henrik Fossum.
 Wicked Instinct is made up of lead singer Tina Indrevær, keyboardist Elise Saltnes, bassist Eirik Kvamme, guitarists Øyvind Zahl and Robert Ulricksborg, and drummer Lars Dahl. "Eg e'kkje aleine" is a soul ballad dedicated to Tina's mother, who passed away in 1999.

Sweden
 Sofie Larsson was born on 3 February 1990 in Malmö. "Superduperkille" is dedicated to her friend Benjamin.
 Fairytale consists of Sofie Andrén, Matilda Lundquist, and Elisabeth Karlsson. The group welcomed a new member, Emelie Rosen, later on.
 Joel Andersson, aged 14 at the time of the contest, was born in Lysekil. In "När blev du och jag vi?", Joel regrets being with his girlfriend for some time, leading to a breakup.

Results
Each participating country sent 3 acts to perform.

Scoreboard
This points was given: 2, 4, 6, 8, 10, and 12

References

External links 
 SVT
 NRK
 DR

MGP Nordic
2002 in Danish television
2002 in Danish music
2002 in Norwegian television
2002 in Norwegian music
2002 in Swedish television
2002 in Swedish music
2002 song contests